Großaitingen is a municipality in the district of Augsburg in Bavaria in Germany. It lies on the Singold and Wertach rivers.

Notable people

 Cyrill Kistler (1848-1907), composer, music theoretician, music educator and music publisher.

References

Augsburg (district)